Rolando is a neighborhood of the Mid-City region of San Diego, California. Rolando is mostly residential with the exception of El Cajon Boulevard, which features the Campus Plaza shopping center.  Rolando is divided by University Avenue into two sections: Rolando Village to the north, and Rolando Park to the south.

Geography
Rolando Village's borders are defined by College Avenue to the West, El Cajon Boulevard to the North, and University Avenue to the South. The eastern border with La Mesa is uneven, and is defined by several residential streets which lie between 67th and 73rd streets.

Rolando Park's borders are defined by College Avenue to the West, University Avenue to the north, the 94 freeway to the south, and the City of La Mesa boundary to the east.

Decorative public walkways known as "Catwalks" for pedestrians and joggers to travel between neighborhood streets are spread throughout Rolando.

Education
Rolando hosts two public elementary schools, one in Rolando Village and one in Rolando Park, both part of the San Diego Unified School District:

 Henry Clay Elementary School
 Rolando Park Elementary School

Clay Elementary shares fields with Clay Neighborhood Park in a joint-use agreement between San Diego Unified and San Diego Parks & Recreation.

References

External links
 Rolando Community Council, Official Site
 College Neighborhoods Foundation | Rolando Fun Facts
College Area Business District
College Rolando Library

Neighborhoods in San Diego